The following lists events that happened during 1905 in the Kingdom of Belgium.

Incumbents

Monarch: Leopold II
Prime Minister: Paul de Smet de Naeyer

Events

February
 5 February – General strike in Belgian coal fields begins.
 10 February – Belgian Labour Party provides striking miners with 12.5 francs each in strike pay.

March
 1 March – Art association Kunst van Heden founded in Antwerp.
 11 March – General strike in the coal fields ends.

April
 27 April – Opening of the Exposition Universelle et Internationale de Liège.
 30 April – First international football fixture between Belgium and the Netherlands held in Antwerp; Dutch win 1–4.

May
 1 May – Season of events to celebrate 75th anniversary of Belgian independence opened.
 7 May – Belgians win international football fixture against France in Brussels, 7–0.

June
 23 June – Strikes for shorter hours in Ghent textile mills.

July
 26 July – Law promulgated making Sunday an obligatory day of rest in trade and industry.
 27 July – Edward Joris arrested in Istanbul for his part in the Yıldız assassination attempt.

August
 1 to 6 August – 1905 European Rowing Championships held on the Ghent–Terneuzen Canal in Ghent.
 12 August – King opens new sports stadium in Antwerp.

September
 27 September – King ceremonially opens Arcade du Cinquantenaire in Brussels.

October
 12 October – First stone of the Basilica of the Sacred Heart, Brussels laid.

November
 5 November – Independent committee of enquiry into abuses in the Congo Free State, set up in response to the publication of the Casement Report the previous year, releases its findings.
 6 November – Exposition Universelle et Internationale de Liège closes.
 12 November – Formal opening of the Belgian-engineered Beijing–Hankou railway.
 25 November – Christian democrats obtain episcopal recognition as a Catholic organisation.
 30 November – Walloon Congress in Liège to promote the culture of French-speaking Belgium and to oppose the movement for greater use of Dutch in public life.

Publications

 La Nation Belge, 1830-1905, conférences jubilaires faites à l’Exposition Universelle et internationale de Liège en 1905 (Liège, Ch. Desoer & Brussels, P. Weissenbruch)

Periodicals
 La Belgique Artistique et Littéraire begins publication.

Scholarship
 Biographie Nationale de Belgique, vol. 18.
 Ernest Closson, Chansons populaires des provinces belges (Brussels, Mainz, London, Leipzig)
 Alphonse Dubois, Remarques sur l'ornithologie de l'État indépendant du Congo
 Hippolyte Fierens-Gevaert, La Renaissance septentrionale et les premiers maitres des Flandres (Brussels, Librarie Nationale d'Art et d'Histoire)
 Godefroid Kurth, La Patrie Belge: 75è Anniversaire de l'Indépendance Nationale (Namur)
 Joseph Van den Gheyn, Catalogue des manuscrits de la Bibliothèque royale de Belgique, vol. 5.
 Joseph Van den Gheyn, La préhistoire en Belgique (1830-1905) (1905)

Literature
 Mark Twain, King Leopold's Soliloquy (Boston)
 Émile Verhaeren, Les heures d'après-midi (Brussels, Edmond Deman)

Art and architecture

Exhibitions
 15 July to 2 November – Retrospective of Belgian art, 1830-1905, Brussels

Sculpture
 Constantin Meunier, The Docker

Buildings
 Victor Horta, Magasins Waucquez
 Gédéon Bordiau and Charles Girault, Arcade du Cinquantenaire, Brussels

Births
 15 January – Jean Van Buggenhout, cyclist (died 1974)
 10 March – René Bernier, composer (died 1984)
 28 March – Jenny Toitgans, athlete
 1 April – Gaston Eyskens, politician (died 1988)
 3 April – Georges Lemaire, cyclist (died 1933)
 10 April – Edgard Viseur, athlete
 4 May – Désiré Acket, painter (died 1987)
 21 June – Alfred De Taeye, politician (died 1958)
 6 July – Suzanne Spaak, resistance operative (died 1944)
 22 October – Maurice Geldhof, cyclist (died 1970)
 17 November – Astrid of Sweden, Queen of the Belgians (died 1935)
 27 November – Daniel Sternefeld, composer (died 1986)
 18 December – Jane Graverol, painter (died 1984)

Deaths
 9 March – Paul Costermans (born 1860), deputy governor general of the Congo Free State, by his own hand
 4 April – Constantin Meunier (born 1831), painter and sculptor
 9 April – Léon d'Andrimont (born 1836), politician
 23 April – Théodore Nilis (born 1851), colonial official
 6 August – Léo Errera (born 1858), plant physiologist
 10 August – Georges Nagelmackers (born 1845), engineer and entrepreneur
 17 November – Prince Philippe, Count of Flanders (born 1837), heir presumptive to the Belgian throne.
 12 December – Reimond Stijns (born 1850), writer

References

 
1900s in Belgium
Belgium
Belgium
Years of the 20th century in Belgium